Ence (stylized as ENCE) is a Finnish esports organization with teams and players competing in Counter-Strike: Global Offensive (CS:GO), PUBG: Battlegrounds, StarCraft II, and NHL 22. ENCE was founded in 2013 and the organization takes inspiration for its name from the Enceladus of Greek mythology. It is currently based in Helsinki and is the most popular esports organization in Finland. The organization also competed in Hearthstone and Overwatch until 2018, and in League of Legends for the 2020 season. ENCE is best known for its success in Starcraft II and CS:GO. Serral was the first non-Korean to win a StarCraft II World Championship and the CS:GO team finished second at IEM Katowice Major 2019.

Counter-Strike: Global Offensive 
ENCE was founded in 2013 and picked up a Finnish CS:GO team which competed in local tournaments. In July 2014, the team disbanded after a series of disappointing results and did not return to CS:GO until 2016. The organization fielded multiple Finnish lineups for the next two years but did not have a stable roster until April 2018, when the organization signed Aleksi "allu" Jalli, Aleksi "Aleksib" Virolainen, Jani "Aerial" Jussila, Jere "sergej" Salo, and Sami "xseveN" Laasanen. The roster of young talent went on an unexpected Cinderella run at IEM Katowice Major 2019 before finally losing in the finals to Astralis. During the Major the team's unlikely success made them a fan favorite among neutrals and in Finland. The Verkkars, a Finnish musical duo, released a song called "EZ4ENCE", titled after the team's chant; it references players, coaches, and team memes. "EZ4ENCE" went viral in Finland during the tournament, eventually becoming the fourth-most-popular song in a Finnish top 50 published by Spotify. The song would later be added into the game by Valve. ENCE remained one of the top CS:GO teams in 2019, winning BLAST Pro Series Madrid and finishing second at DreamHack Masters Dallas and IEM Chicago.

IEM Katowice 2019 remains ENCE's best performance at a CS:GO Major, although they reached the playoff round of StarLadder Major: Berlin 2019 and the semifinals of PGL Major Antwerp 2022.

The team's results worsened at the start of 2020 and ENCE gradually replaced all of the players from the IEM Katowice run with an international roster. In February 2022, with the release of Joonas "doto⁠" Forss, ENCE's roster was completely non-Finnish for the first time in the organization's history. The team instead set up a Finnish academy team. Shortly after, ENCE partnered with ESL, receiving a guaranteed spot in the ESL Pro League. The new roster has reached the top-5 of HLTV's world rankings.

Current roster

Starcraft II
Serral, a Finnish Zerg player, joined ENCE in October 2016 and is one of the best players in the world. In 2018, Serral became the first non-Korean player to win a StarCraft II World Championship.

NHL esports
Finish player Erik "EKI" Tammenpää represents ENCE in NHL esports. EKI is the most successful Finnish player in the game and one of the top players globally. He was chosen by the Finnish Association of Sports Journalists as the 2021 Finnish esport athlete of the year.

References

Counter-Strike teams
Defunct and inactive Hearthstone teams
Defunct and inactive League of Legends teams
Defunct and inactive Overwatch teams
Esports teams based in Finland
Esports teams established in 2013
PlayerUnknown's Battlegrounds teams
StarCraft teams